Alban Glossop (July 12, 1914 – July 2, 1991) was an American professional baseball infielder. The native of Christopher, Illinois, had a 17-year career, including 309 games in Major League Baseball over all or parts of five seasons (–, – and ) as a member of the New York Giants, Boston Bees, Philadelphia Phillies, Brooklyn Dodgers and Chicago Cubs, all of the National League.

Glossop attended Belleville High School. His baseball career extended from 1932 through 1950, less two seasons of World War II service in the United States Navy in the Pacific Theatre in 1944 and 1945. In the major leagues, he was primarily a second baseman, getting into 195 games, with 37 games as a third baseman and 36 as a shortstop. He was the 1942 Phillies' starting second baseman. Altogether, he batted .209 in the big leagues, with his 199 hits including 29 doubles, two triples, and 15 home runs. He was credited with 86 runs batted in.

He died at age 76 in Walnut Creek, California.

External links

1914 births
1991 deaths
United States Navy personnel of World War II
Baseball players from Illinois
Boston Bees players
Brooklyn Dodgers players
Charlotte Hornets (baseball) players
Chicago Cubs players
Jersey City Giants players
Kansas City Blues (baseball) players
Keokuk Indians players
Lincoln Links players
Los Angeles Angels (minor league) players
Major League Baseball second basemen
Military personnel from Illinois
Muskegon Reds players
New York Giants (NL) players
People from Christopher, Illinois
Philadelphia Phillies players
Rocky Mount Red Sox players
Syracuse Chiefs players